Celeste Holm (April 29, 1917 – July 15, 2012) was an American stage, film and television actress.

Holm won an Academy Award for her performance in Elia Kazan's Gentleman's Agreement (1947), and was nominated for her roles in Come to the Stable (1949) and All About Eve (1950). She also is known for her performances in The Snake Pit (1948), A Letter to Three Wives (1949), and High Society (1956). She is also known for originating the role of Ado Annie in the Rodgers and Hammerstein musical Oklahoma! (1943).

Early life
Born and raised in Manhattan, Holm was an only child. Her mother, Jean Parke, was an American portrait artist and author. Her father, Theodor Holm, was a Norwegian businessman whose company provided marine adjustment services for Lloyd's of London. Because of her parents' occupations, she traveled often during her youth and attended various schools in the Netherlands, France and the United States. She began high school at the University School for Girls in Chicago, and then transferred to the Francis W. Parker School (Chicago) where she performed in many school stage productions and graduated as a member of the class of 1935. She then studied drama at the University of Chicago before becoming a stage actress in the late 1930s.

Career

Holm's first professional theatrical role was in a production of Hamlet starring Leslie Howard. She first appeared on Broadway in a small part in Gloriana (1938), a comedy which lasted for only five performances, but her first major part on Broadway was in William Saroyan's revival of The Time of Your Life (1940) as Mary L. with fellow newcomer Gene Kelly. The role that got her the most recognition from critics and audiences was as Ado Annie in the premiere production of Rodgers and Hammerstein's Oklahoma! in 1943.

After she starred in the Broadway production of Bloomer Girl, 20th Century Fox signed Holm to a movie contract in 1946. She made her film debut that same year in Three Little Girls in Blue, making a startling entrance in a "Technicolor red" dress singing "Always a Lady," a belting Ado Annie-type song, although the character was different—a lady. For her role in Gentleman's Agreement (1947), she won an Oscar and Golden Globe for Best Supporting Actress. However, after another supporting role in All About Eve, Holm realized she preferred live theater to movie work, and only accepted a few select film roles over the next decade. The most successful of these were the comedy The Tender Trap (1955) and the musical High Society (1956), both of which co-starred Frank Sinatra. She starred as a professor-turned-reporter in New York City in the CBS television series Honestly, Celeste! (fall 1954) and was thereafter a panelist on Who Pays? (1959). She also appeared ABC's The Pat Boone Chevy Showroom.

In 1958, she starred as a reporter in an unsold television pilot called The Celeste Holm Show, based on the book No Facilities for Women. In 1965, she played the Fairy Godmother alongside Lesley Ann Warren in the CBS production of Cinderella. In 1970–71, she was featured on the NBC  sitcom Nancy, with Renne Jarrett, John Fink and Robert F. Simon. In the storyline, Holm played Abby Townsend, the press secretary of the First Lady of the United States and the chaperone of Jarrett's character, Nancy Smith, the President's daughter.

During the 1970s and 1980s, Holm did more screen acting, with roles in films such as Tom Sawyer and Three Men and a Baby, and in television series (often as a guest star) such as Columbo, The Eleventh Hour, Archie Bunker's Place and Falcon Crest. In 1979, she played the role of First Lady Florence Harding in the television mini-series, Backstairs at the White House. Holm also starred in the musical The Utter Glory of Morrissey Hall, which flopped after a single performance (and seven previews) on Broadway. In December 1981 Holm appeared in the lead role in the British premiere of Kurt Weill's Lady in the Dark at the Nottingham Playhouse. She was a regular on the ABC soap opera Loving, appearing first in 1986 in the role of Lydia Woodhouse and again as Isabelle Dwyer Alden #2 from 1991 to 1992. She last appeared on television in the CBS television series Promised Land (1996–99).

Honors

A life member of The Actors Studio, Holm received numerous honors during her lifetime, including the 1968 Sarah Siddons Award for distinguished achievement in Chicago theatre; she was appointed to the National Arts Council by then-President Ronald Reagan, appointed Knight, First Class of the Order of St. Olav by King Olav of Norway in 1979, and inducted into the American Theater Hall of Fame in 1992. She remained active for social causes as a spokesperson for UNICEF, and for occasional professional engagements.  From 1995 she was Chairman of the Board of Arts Horizons, a not-for-profit arts-in-education organization. In 1995, Holm was inducted into the Scandinavian-American Hall of Fame.

In 2006, Holm was presented with a Lifetime Achievement Award by the SunDeis Film Festival at Brandeis University.

Holm was a guest at the 2009 Mid-Atlantic Nostalgia Convention in Aberdeen, Maryland. Some of the movies in which she appeared were screened at the festival, and the unaired television pilot for Meet Me in St. Louis was shown. She received an honorary award during the dinner banquet at the close of the event.

Personal life
Holm's first marriage was at age 19 to Ralph Nelson in 1936. The marriage ended in 1939. Their son is Internet pioneer and sociologist Ted Nelson.

Holm married Francis Emerson Harding Davies, an English auditor, on January 7, 1940. Davies was a Roman Catholic, and she was received into the Roman Catholic Church for the purposes of their 1940 wedding; the marriage was dissolved on May 8, 1945.

From 1946 to 1952, Holm was married to airline public relations executive A. Schuyler Dunning, with whom she had a second son, businessman Daniel Dunning.

In 1961, Holm married actor Wesley Addy. The couple lived together on her family farm in Washington Township, Morris County, New Jersey. He died in 1996.

On April 29, 2004, her 87th birthday, Holm married opera singer Frank Basile, who was 41 years old. The couple had met in October 1999 at a fundraiser for which Basile had been hired to sing. Soon after their marriage, Holm and Basile sued to overturn the irrevocable trust that was created in 2002 by Daniel Dunning, Holm's younger son. The trust was ostensibly set up to shelter Holm's financial assets from taxes though Basile contended the real purpose of the trust was to keep him away from her money. The lawsuit began a five-year battle, which cost millions of dollars, and according to an article in The New York Times, left Holm and her husband with a "fragile hold" on their apartment, which Holm had purchased for $10,000 cash in 1953 from her film earnings, and which in 2011 was believed to be worth at least $10,000,000.

Health and death
According to Basile, Holm had been treated for memory loss since 2002, suffered skin cancer, bleeding ulcers and a collapsed lung, and had hip replacements and pacemakers.

In June 2012, Holm was admitted to New York's Roosevelt Hospital with dehydration, where she suffered a heart attack on July 13, 2012; she died two days later at her Central Park West apartment, aged 95.

Work

Film

Television

Theatre

Radio

Awards and nominations 

In 1960, Holme received two stars on the Hollywood Walk of Fame, one for her work in Motion Pictures located at 1500 Vine Street, and the other for her work on Television at the location 6821 Hollywood Blvd.

References

External links

 
 
 
 
 
 Portrait of Celeste Holm and Wesley Addy by Margaret Holland Sargent
 Obituary at We Love Soaps

1917 births
2012 deaths
Actresses from New York City
Actresses from New Jersey
American women singers
American film actresses
American people of Norwegian descent
American stage actresses
American television actresses
Audiobook narrators
Best Supporting Actress Academy Award winners
Best Supporting Actress Golden Globe (film) winners
People from Washington Township, Morris County, New Jersey
Singers from New York City
20th-century American actresses
21st-century American actresses
20th Century Studios contract players
Recipients of the St. Olav's Medal

 Francis W. Parker School (Chicago) alumni